Tall Pines may refer to:

 Tall Pines (Hattiesburg, Mississippi), listed on the NRHP in Mississippi
 Tall Pines (Cazenovia, New York), listed on the NRHP in New York

See also
 Tall Pines Motor Inn, listed on the NRHP in Arkansas